Aglaia oligophylla is a species of plant in the family Meliaceae. It is found in Brunei, India, Indonesia, Malaysia, the Philippines, Singapore, and Thailand.

References

oligophylla
Near threatened plants
Taxonomy articles created by Polbot